Catrin Jexell (born 17 February 1963) is a former professional tennis player from Sweden.

Biography
Originally from Halmstad, Jexell played professionally in the 1980s. She first competed for the Sweden Fed Cup team in 1982 and featured in a total of seven ties. Her only WTA title came at the 1982 Hong Kong Open. In 1983 she was runner-up at Ridgewood and had a win over Hana Mandlikova at Filderstadt. She made the third round of the 1984 French Open.

WTA Tour finals

Singles (1-1)

Doubles (0-1)

ITF finals

Singles (3–2)

Doubles (3–1)

References

External links
 
 
 

1963 births
Living people
Swedish female tennis players
Sportspeople from Halmstad
Sportspeople from Halland County
20th-century Swedish women
21st-century Swedish women